The Wellington Arch, also known as the Constitution Arch or (originally) as the Green Park Arch, is a Grade I-listed triumphal arch by Decimus Burton that forms a centrepiece of Hyde Park Corner in central London, between corners of Hyde Park and Green Park; it stands on a large traffic island with crossings for pedestrian access. From its construction (1826–1830) the arch stood in a different location nearby; it was moved to its current site in 1882–1883. It originally supported a colossal equestrian statue of the 1st Duke of Wellington by the sculptor Matthew Cotes Wyatt, acquiring its name as a result. Peace descending on the Quadriga of War by sculptor Adrian Jones, a bronze quadriga (an ancient four-horse chariot) ridden by the Goddess of Victory Nike, has surmounted the arch since 1912.

History

Construction 
 
Both the Wellington Arch and Marble Arch (originally sited in front of Buckingham Palace) were planned in 1825 by George IV to commemorate Britain's victories in the Napoleonic Wars. During the second half of the 1820s, the Commissioners of Woods and Forests and the King resolved that Hyde Park, and the area around it, should be renovated to match the splendour of rival European capital cities, and that the essence of the new arrangement would be a triumphal approach to the recently completed Buckingham Palace. The committee of the project, led by the Prime Minister, Lord Liverpool, and advised by Charles Arbuthnot, President of the Board of Commissioners of Woods and Forests, selected Decimus Burton as the project's architect. In 1828, when giving evidence to a Parliamentary Select Committee on the Government's spending on public works, Arbuthnot explained that he had nominated Burton "having seen in the Regent's Park, and elsewhere, works which pleased my eye, from their architectural beauty and correctness". Burton intended to create an urban space dedicated to the celebration of the House of Hanover, national pride, and the nation's heroes.

The renovation of Hyde Park, Green Park, and St James's Park began in 1825, with the demarcation of new drives and pathways, subsequent to which Burton designed new lodges and gates, viz. Cumberland Gate, Stanhope Gate, Grosvenor Gate, the Hyde Park Gate/Screen at Hyde Park Corner, and, later, the Prince of Wales's Gate, Knightsbridge, in the classical style. There were no authoritative precedents for such buildings, which required windows and chimney stacks, in the classical style, and, in the words of Guy Williams, "Burton's reticent treatment of the supernumerary features" and of the cast iron gates and railings was "greatly admired".

At Hyde Park Corner, the King required "some great ceremonial outwork that would be worthy of the new palace that lay to its rear", and accepted Burton's consequent proposal for a sequence comprising a gateway and a classical screen, and a triumphal arch, which would enable those approaching Buckingham Palace from the north to ride or drive first through the screen and then through the arch, before turning left to descend Constitution Hill and enter the forecourt of Buckingham Palace through Nash's Marble Arch. The screen became the neoclassical Hyde Park Gate/Screen at Hyde Park Corner, which delighted the King and his Committee, and which the architectural historian Guy Williams describes as "one of the most pleasing architectural works that have survived from the neo-classical age". The triumphal arch became the Wellington Arch at Constitution Hill into Green Park, London, which has been described as "one of London's best loved landmarks". Burton's original design for the triumphal arch, which was modelled on the Arch of Titus at Rome, on which the central and side blocks of the Screen had been modelled, was more technically perfect, and coherent with the Screen, than that of the arch that was subsequently built: this original design, however, was rejected by the Committee – who had envisaged a design based on the Arch of Constantine, on which Nash's Marble Arch had been modelled – because it was not sufficiently ostentatious. Burton created a new design, "to pander to the majestic ego", which was much larger and modelled on a fragment found in the Roman Forum, which was accepted on 14 January 1826, and subsequently built as the present Wellington Arch.

The arch has a single opening, and uses the Corinthian order. Much of the intended exterior ornamentation was omitted as a cost-saving exercise necessitated by the King's overspending on the refurbishment of Buckingham Palace, which was underway at the same time. A contemporary account, written in anticipation of its completion to its original plan, describes what was intended:The entabulature is lofty and elegant with a richly sculptured frieze, and a row of boldly projecting lions' heads on the cymatium, marking the centres of columns and other sub-divisions of the order. Above the entablature, on a lofty blocking course, is raised an attic, the body of which is embellished with a sculptural representation of an ancient triumph. On each of the columns is a statue of a warrior, and on the summit of the acroterium which surmounts the attic is a figure in a quadriga or ancient four horse chariot.

Sculpture of the triumphal arch 

The arch at Constitution Hill was left devoid of decorative sculpture as a result of the moratorium in 1828 on public building work, and, instead, despite the absolute objection of Burton, was mounted with an ungainly equestrian statue of the Duke of Wellington by Matthew Cotes Wyatt, the son of the then recently deceased James Wyatt, who had been selected by statue's commissioner, and one of its few subsequent advocates, Sir Frederick Trench. Matthew Cotes Wyatt was not competent: Guy Williams contends that he were "not noticeably talented", and the Dictionary of National Biography that "thanks to royal and other influential patronage, Wyatt enjoyed a reputation and practice to which his mediocre abilities hardly entitled him".

Trench, and his patrons the Duke and Duchess of Rutland, had told the public subscribers to the statue that the statue would be placed on top of Burton's triumphal arch at Hyde Park Corner; Burton expressed his opposition to this proposal "as plainly and as vehemently as his nature allowed" consistently over successive years, because the ungainly statue would "disfigure" his arch, for which it was much too large, and the surrounding neighbourhood, because it would have to be placed, contrary to all classical precedent, across, instead of parallel with, the roadway under the arch. Burton had envisaged that his arch would be topped with only a small quadriga whose horses would have been parallel with the road under the arch. Burton's objections were extensively endorsed by most of the aristocratic residents of London. A writer in The Builder asked Lord Canning, the First Commissioner for Woods and Forests, to ban the project: We have learnt, and can state positively, that Mr. Burton has the strongest objection possible against placing the group in question on the archway... and that he is taking no part whatever in the alteration proposed to be made in the upper part of the structure to prepare it to receive the pedestal... Mr. Burton, through the mildness which characterizes him, has not expressed this opinion so loudly and so publicly as he ought to have done.... an opinion prevails very generally, that he is a party to the proceedings, and this has induced many to be silent who would otherwise have spoken...

The Prime Minister, Sir Robert Peel, contended that another site would be preferable, and proposed, on behalf of the Crown, to offer any other site, but the statue's subscribers rejected all alternative proposals. Every single MP except Sir Frederick Trench wanted the statue to be placed elsewhere. Canning wrote that "the remonstrances which reach Her Majesty's Government against the proposed appropriation of the arch are so many and so strong, the representations of its architect, Mr. Burton, in the same sense, are so earnest, and the opinion of every other eminent architect, artist, or other competent authority who has been consulted on the subject is so decided [against the placing of the Wellington statue on the arch]".

Decimus Burton himself wrote, "The arch would, I consider, suffer greatly in importance if the colossal statue in question be placed there, because it would become a mere pedestal. The want of proportion in the proposed surmount, compared with the columns and other details of the architecture, would show that they had been designed by different hands, and without reference for each other. ...I have desired to witness the completion of this building, as originally designed by me, and as approved by the Lords of the Treasury, yet I would prefer that the building should remain for the present in its forlorn and bare state, rather than a colossal equestrian statue should be placed upon it... I fear that if this appropriation of the building should be decided upon, a proposition would soon be made for removing altogether the facades of columns, the slender proportions of which would appear so incongruous and out of proportion compared with the prodigious dimensions of the statue". Burton had realized that the disciples of Pugin and advocates of Pugin's anti-classicism would remove all classical elements from his arch if permitted the opportunity to do so.

The Government placed the Wellington statue on the arch in autumn 1846; Williams contends that the product was "ridiculous". The Builder contended, "down, unquestionably, it must come. As the network of timber is removed, spar by spar, from before it, so do the folly of the experiment, the absurdity of the conjunction, and the greatness of the sacrifice become apparent. Its effect is even worse than we anticipated – the destruction of the arch by the statue, and of the statue by its elevation on the arch, more complete. Every post brings us letters urging renewed efforts to remove the figure to another site". The contestation about the prospective removal of the statue became national. However, the Government failed to remove the statue, despite that they had professed, when it had been placed, that they would do so if it provoked the aversion which it had provoked. Foreign intellectuals who visited London identified the incongruous fusion of the statue and the arch as "spectacular confirmation" of the "artistic ignorance of the English". Guy Williams writes that "[the] arch at Hyde Park Corner is a visible reminder of one of the fiercest attacks that have ever been launched in the worlds of art and architecture. The face of London might have been very different now – freer, perhaps, of the 'monstrous carbuncles' so disliked by the present Prince of Wales – if the attacked party [Decimus Burton] had been a little more pugnacious, and so better equipped to stand his ground".

During 1882, traffic congestion at Hyde Park Corner motivated advocacy for Burton's triumphal arch to be moved to the top of Constitution Hill to create space for traffic. In response to this advocacy, Burton's great-nephew Francis Fearon compiled and published a pamphlet that advocated the removal of the Wellington statue from the arch in the event of the removal of the arch to another location: Fearon contended that the arch should be "relieved once and for all of its unsightly load". The campaign led by Fearon was successful: Wyatt's incongruous statue was removed to Aldershot, and its place on Burton's arch, which was moved to Constitution Hill in 1883, was occupied by a Quadriga by Captain Adrian Jones. Jones' statue is not nearly as elegant as Burton's designed statue intended for the arch, but it is more coherent with the arch than Wyatt's statue, and its figures, unlike those of Wyatt's statue, are aligned with the roadway under the arch.

Jones's statue is based on a smaller original which caught the eye of Edward VII at a Royal Academy exhibition.  The sculpture depicts Nike, the winged goddess of victory, descending on the chariot of war, holding the classical symbol of victory and honour, a laurel wreath. The face of the charioteer leading the quadriga is that of a small boy (actually the son of Lord Michelham, who funded the sculpture). The angel of peace was modelled on Beatrice Stewart. The statue is the largest bronze sculpture in Europe. The boundary of Buckingham Palace's garden was moved south, and a new road named Duke of Wellington Place was created; this separated the space containing the Arch from the rest of the Green Park.

Public access

The arch is hollow inside and until 1992 housed the smallest police station in London. Transferred to the ownership of English Heritage in 1999, it is open to the paying public: three floors of exhibits detailing the history of the arch, Exhibition space, and high terraces on both sides of the arch with views of the surrounding area. One half of the arch functions as a ventilation shaft for the Hyde Park Corner road underpass, constructed in 1961–1962.

See also
Equestrian statue of the Duke of Wellington, Aldershot

References

External links

Wellington Arch Victorian-era postcard

Monuments and memorials in London
Monuments to Arthur Wellesley, 1st Duke of Wellington
Cultural infrastructure completed in 1830
English Heritage sites in London
Grade I listed buildings in the City of Westminster
Grade I listed monuments and memorials
Buildings and structures in Hyde Park, London
Museums in the City of Westminster
Former Metropolitan Police stations
Terminating vistas in the United Kingdom
Triumphal arches in the United Kingdom
Tourist attractions in the City of Westminster
1830 establishments in England
Decimus Burton buildings
Georgian architecture in the City of Westminster
Neoclassical architecture in London
Horses in art
Sculptures of Nike